The discography of Roddy Ricch, an American singer, consists of two studio albums, three mixtapes, and 45 singles (including 23 as a featured artist). His debut studio album, Please Excuse Me for Being Antisocial (2019), debuted at number one on the US Billboard 200. The album includes the singles "Big Stepper", "Start wit Me", "Tip Toe", "The Box", and "High Fashion". "The Box" became Roddy Ricch's highest-charting song worldwide, spending eleven weeks at number one on the US Billboard Hot 100; as well as topping the charts in Canada, New Zealand, Hungary, and peaking at number two in both the United Kingdom and Ireland.

Albums

Studio albums

Mixtapes

Singles

As lead artist

As featured artist

Other charted songs

Guest appearances

Notes

References

External links
 
 
 
 

Discographies of American artists